Jim Culhane (born March 13, 1965) is a Canadian retired ice hockey defenceman. He played for the Hartford Whalers. Culhane coached the Western Michigan Broncos men's ice hockey team from 1999 to 2010.

Career
Culhane played at Western Michigan during one of the most successful periods in program history. After graduating in 1987 he embarked on a short professional career, before retiring in 1992. In 1993 he returned to his alma mater and served as an assistant under Bill Wilkinson until the latter was fired in the midst of an investigation into the program after two players were arrested at a team party.

For a brief time Culhane was able to right the ship in Kalamazoo but once Wilkinson's last recruiting class left the team sunk towards the bottom of the conference and never had a winning record under Culhane's stewardship again. Over the course of his 11 full seasons Culhane could only get the Broncos out of the CCHA first round only twice and lost all four quarterfinal games his team played in. Western Michigan announced that they were firing Culhane in February 2010 but allowed the coach to finish out the season.

Career Statistics

Head Coaching Record

† Culhane replaced Bill Wilkinson in February 1999

References

External links
 

1965 births
Living people
Binghamton Whalers players
Canadian ice hockey defencemen
Capital District Islanders players
Hartford Whalers draft picks
Hartford Whalers players
Sportspeople from Temiskaming Shores
Kansas City Blades players
Western Michigan Broncos ice hockey coaches
Ice hockey people from Ontario